BHT may refer to:

 Berliner Hochschule für Technik, is the second largest University of Applied Sciences in Berlin
 Black hairy tongue
 Blue Hill Troupe, a New York City-based musical theatre company
 Boğaziçi Hava Taşımacılığı, a former Turkish airline
 Bosnia and Herzegovina Television
 Broken Hill type ore deposit
 Butylated hydroxytoluene, an organic compound